Arthur (Artturi) Fredrik Hiidenheimo (23 May 1877, Vihti – 14 January 1956; surname until 1906 Törnström) was a Finnish farmer and politician. He was a member of the Parliament of Finland from 1919 to 1927, representing the National Coalition Party.

References

1877 births
1956 deaths
People from Vihti
People from Uusimaa Province (Grand Duchy of Finland)
Finnish Lutherans
National Coalition Party politicians
Members of the Parliament of Finland (1919–22)
Members of the Parliament of Finland (1922–24)
Members of the Parliament of Finland (1924–27)